Carlos Mauricio "Camau" Espínola (born 5 October 1971) is an Argentine windsurfer and politician. He served as Mayor of Corrientes from 2009 to 2013 and is a National Senator since 2015.

Sailing career
Nicknamed Camau, Espínola was born in Corrientes and started training at the Club Náutico de La Totora in his home province. He obtained his first important award, a silver medal, during the Pan American Games held in 1991 in Havana. In the following games, held in Mar del Plata in 1995, Espínola obtained the gold medal.

A year later he won the silver medal at the 1996 Olympics held in Atlanta; he would win a silver medal at the Olympic Games in Sydney. In 1998, he won the gold medal in the European windsurf Championship held in Greece.

Espínola then decided to change category, from Mistral (windsurf) to Tornado, with Santiago Lange he got a bronze medal at the 2004 Summer Olympics in Athens, and then again in the 2008 Summer Olympics in Beijing, becoming the Argentine sportsman with most Olympic medals (this record of four medals was equalled in 2012 by field hockey player Luciana Aymar). He is also the only sportsperson who had the honor of being the flag bearer for Argentina in two Summer Olympic Games (2000 in Sydney and 2004 in Athens).

In 1996, Carlos received the Gold Olimpia Award as the best athlete of the year from his country. He won the Platinum Konex Award two times, in 2000 and 2010, as the best sailor from the each decade in Argentina.

Political career
In April 2009, Espínola announced he was a candidate for the office of Mayor of Corrientes, on the ticket of Fabián Ríos, Front for Victory candidate for Governor of Corrientes Province. He was elected as mayor of his native city on 13 September, and on 10 December he took office. He is a member of the Justicialist Party (Peronist) and of the Front for Victory (Kirchnerist), the Peronist faction and alliance led by President Cristina Fernández de Kirchner. Espínola was nominated as the Front for Victory candidate for governor ahead of the September 2013 elections in Corrientes. He was defeated by incumbent Governor Ricardo Colombi of the centrist UCR, however, by a 51-to-46% margin; Espínola was succeeded as mayor by fellow Front for Victory lawmaker Fabián Ríos.

In 2015, Espínola was elected Senator.

References

External links
 

1971 births
Living people
Argentine windsurfers
Argentine male sailors (sport)
Olympic sailors of Argentina
Olympic silver medalists for Argentina
Olympic bronze medalists for Argentina
Olympic medalists in sailing
Sailors at the 1992 Summer Olympics – Lechner A-390
Sailors at the 1996 Summer Olympics – Mistral One Design
Sailors at the 2000 Summer Olympics – Mistral One Design
Sailors at the 2004 Summer Olympics – Tornado
Sailors at the 2008 Summer Olympics – Tornado
Medalists at the 1996 Summer Olympics
Medalists at the 2000 Summer Olympics
Medalists at the 2004 Summer Olympics
Medalists at the 2008 Summer Olympics
Pan American Games gold medalists for Argentina
Pan American Games silver medalists for Argentina
Pan American Games medalists in sailing
Sailors at the 1991 Pan American Games
Sailors at the 1995 Pan American Games
Medalists at the 1991 Pan American Games
Medalists at the 1995 Pan American Games
Tornado class world champions
World champions in sailing for Argentina
Argentine sportsperson-politicians
People from Corrientes
Mayors of Corrientes
Justicialist Party politicians
Members of the Argentine Senate for Corrientes